Márcia Jaqueline (born  July 16, 1982, Rio de Janeiro) is prima ballerina in the ballet of the Theatro Municipal do Rio de Janeiro.

References

People from Rio de Janeiro (city)
1982 births
Living people
Brazilian ballerinas